William Mills Millar (20 March 1901 – 19 July 1966) was a Scottish professional footballer who played as an outside forward in Scottish football for Dunipace Juniors, Bo'ness, Hearts and Ayr United, in the Football League for Middlesbrough and York City, in non-League football for Rhyl Athletic and York Wednesday, in Irish football for Glentoran and Drumcondra and was on the books of Crewe Alexandra without making a league appearance.

References

1901 births
Footballers from Falkirk (council area)
1966 deaths
Scottish footballers
Association football forwards
Dunipace F.C. players
Bo'ness F.C. players
Heart of Midlothian F.C. players
Ayr United F.C. players
Rhyl F.C. players
Middlesbrough F.C. players
York City F.C. players
Glentoran F.C. players
Crewe Alexandra F.C. players
Drumcondra F.C. players
York Wednesday F.C. players
Scottish Football League players
English Football League players